The 2012 LKL Slam Dunk Contest, was an event that was a part of the LKL's All-Star Day, that took place in Klaipėda's Švyturys Arena, on March 3. The winner of this event was Sonny Weems, of Žalgiris.

Results 
The results of this contest are documented below:

References 

Slam